Lamberson may refer to:

Greg Lamberson (born 1964), American filmmaker and author
Jay G. Lamberson (1846–1927), American politician, member of the Wisconsin State Assembly
Josh Lamberson (born 1982), American football coach and former player
Tip Lamberson (1922–2005), AKA "N.D. Lamberson", premier American flute maker
Josiah Lamberson Parrish (1806–1895), American missionary in the Pacific Northwest

See also
Jack Lamberson House, AKA the Maunu house, a historic residence in Oskaloosa, Iowa, United States
Lambertson